In the Chicago mayoral election of 1860, Democrat John Wentworth defeated Republican Walter S. Gurnee.

Both candidates had served as mayor before and, incidentally, each had previously been mayor under the opposite party affiliation. Gurnee had served two terms as a Democrat, having been elected in 1851 and 1852, Wentworth had previously served one term as a Republican, having been elected in 1857.

The election was held on March 3.

Results

References

Mayoral elections in Chicago
Chicago
Chicago
1860s in Chicago